The lateral dorsal cutaneous nerve is a cutaneous branch of the foot. 

This nerve is the terminal nerve portion of the sural nerve. The common convention for where the sural nerve transitions into the lateral dorsal cutaneous nerve is after the sural nerve wraps underneath the lateral malleolus. This turns into a dorsal digital nerve and supplies the lateral side of the fourth and fifth toe.

The course of this nerve influences the surgical approach to fixation of fractures of the fifth metatarsal, as the most direct surgical approach is at risk of damaging it.

Additional images

References

Nerves of the lower limb and lower torso